Circles (/Krugovi) is a 2013 Serbian drama film directed by Srdan Golubović. The film was selected as the Serbian entry for the Best Foreign Language Film at the 86th Academy Awards, but it was not nominated. The film won the Prize of the Ecumenical Jury at the 63rd Berlin International Film Festival and the Grand Prix, Golden Apricot at the 2013 Yerevan International Film Festival, Armenia, for Best Feature Film as well as the Grand Prix at 2013 CinEast Festival.

Plot

The film is inspired by the true story of Bosnian Serb soldier Srđan Aleksić who died protecting Bosniak civilian Alen Glavović in January 1993 in Trebinje during the Bosnian War. Three stories take place in parallel in Belgrade, Germany, and Trebinje. Nebojša who witnessed the death of his best friend overcomes his guilty conscience to confront the killer. Haris who owes his life to the person who sacrificed for him risks everything in order to return the favour. The murderer's son meets the fallen hero's father thus opening the way to overcoming the past.

Cast
 Aleksandar Berček as Ranko
 Leon Lučev as Haris
 Nebojša Glogovac as Nebojša
 Nikola Rakočević as Bogdan
 Hristina Popović as Nada
 Boris Isaković as Todor
 Vuk Kostić as Marko (Srđan Aleksić)

See also
 List of submissions to the 86th Academy Awards for Best Foreign Language Film
 List of Serbian submissions for the Academy Award for Best Foreign Language Film

References

External links
 

2013 films
2013 war drama films
2013 drama films
Films set in 1993
2010s Serbian-language films
Bosnian War films
Serbian war drama films
Films set in Belgrade
Films set in Germany
Films set in Bosnia and Herzegovina
Films shot in Belgrade
Cultural depictions of Serbian men
Cultural depictions of Bosnia and Herzegovina men